Kianja Barea Mahamasina is a rugby union and football (multi-purpose) stadium, also used for concerts and athletics, in Antananarivo, Madagascar.

Usage
It is used mostly for rugby and football matches. The stadium has a 40,880 capacity for football and rugby matches.

Incidents
In 2005, the stadium was the site of a stampede that killed two people during a match between South African side Kaizer Chiefs and Madagascar's USJF Ravinala. It was also the stadium of the 2007 Indian Ocean Games.

On 26 June 2016, during a free concert, a bomb detonated in the stadium, killing two people and injuring around 80.

On 8 September 2018 a stampede to enter the stadium killed one person and injured 37. Long queues had formed to see the 2019 Africa Cup of Nations qualification match against Senegal with some news sources stating that there had been lines kilometers long vying to enter the stadium from its only entrance.

On 26 June 2019, at least 16 people were killed and 101 injured in a human crush before the concert of Rossy at the stadium on independence day. The show was about to start, and people heard that they could enter the stadium, but the police had left the doors closed. People tried to force the doors but they remained closed; the crowd kept pushing.

Malagasy stadiums 

The Mahamasina Municipal Stadium is the largest stadium in Madagascar.

References

External links
Stadiums Pictures
 Photo at worldstadiums.com
 Photos at fussballtempel.net

Football venues in Madagascar
Athletics (track and field) venues in Madagascar
National stadiums
Buildings and structures in Antananarivo
Multi-purpose stadiums